Trophocosta conchodes is a species of moth of the family Tortricidae. It is found in New Guinea.

The wingspan is about 9 mm. The forewings are light ochreous-yellowish, with violet-silvery iridescence. The basal patch has a rather oblique edge and a moderately broad rather oblique central fascia. There is also a moderate fascia from three-fourths of the costa to the tornus and a narrow terminal fascia formed by yellow-ochreous suffusion. It is indistinct and marked with small tufts of scales, some of which are sprinkled with blackish. The hindwings are light grey.

References

Moths described in 1910
Tortricini
Moths of New Guinea
Taxa named by Edward Meyrick